The 2023 Grand Canyon Antelopes men's volleyball team represents Grand Canyon University in the 2023 NCAA Division I & II men's volleyball season. The 'Lopes, led by eighth year head coach Matt Werle, play their home games at GCU Arena. The 'Lopes are members of the MPSF and were picked to finish fourth in the MPSF preseason poll.

Season highlights
Will be filled in as the season progresses.

Roster

Schedule
TV/Internet Streaming information:
All home games will be streamed on ESPN+. Most road games will also be streamed by the schools streaming service. The conference tournament will be streamed by FloVolleyball. 

 *-Indicates conference match. (#)-Indicates tournament seeding.
 Times listed are Time in Arizona.

Announcers for televised games

Lindenwood: Houston Boe & Braden Dohrmann
Lindenwood: Braden Dohrmann & Houston Boe
George Mason: Josh Yourish
Erskine: 
UC San Diego: 
Lees-McRae: 
Lees-McRae: 
UC Irvine: 
UC Irvine: 
Arizona Christian: 
USC: 
USC: 
Pepperdine:
Pepperdine: 
BYU: 
BYU: 
Ball State: 
Olivet Nazarene: 
Princeton: 
Princeton: 
Concordia Irvine: 
Concordia Irvine: 
UCLA: 
UCLA: 
Stanford: 
Stanford: 
MPSF Tournament:

Rankings 

^The Media did not release a Pre-season or Week 1 poll.

References

2023 in sports in Arizona
2023 NCAA Division I & II men's volleyball season
Grand Canyon